A radix, or base, is the number of unique digits, including zero, used to represent numbers in a positional numeral system.

Radix may also refer to:

Mathematics and science 
 Radix (gastropod), a genus of freshwater snails
 Radical symbol (√), used to indicate a root
 Root, in biology

Computing 
Radix point, a symbol used in mathematics to separate the integral part of the number from its fractional part
Radix sort, a computer sorting algorithm
Radix tree, a type of set data structure
DEC Radix-50, a character encoding
Radix-64, a character encoding

Entertainment 
 Radix Ace Entertainment, a Japanese Animation studio
 Radix Tetrad, a science fiction novel series by A. A. Attanasio
 Radix (novel), the first novel, published in 1981
 Radix: Beyond the Void, a 1995 first-person shooter video game

Other 
 Radix (Company), founded by Bhavin Turakhia
 Radix Journal, an online periodical published by the National Policy Institute

See also 
Base (disambiguation)
Root (disambiguation)